Goodbye, Ninon (Spanish: Adiós, Ninón) is a 1960 Spanish film directed by José Luis Madrid.

Cast
 Manuel Arbó 
 María Esquivel 
 Ángel Jordán 
 Santiago Rivero 
 Tony Soler

References

Bibliography 
 Pascual Cebollada & Luis Rubio Gil. Enciclopedia del cine español: cronología''. Ediciones del Serbal, 1996.

External links 
 

1960 films
Spanish drama films
1960s Spanish-language films
Films directed by José Luis Madrid
1960s Spanish films